The lesser crested tern (Thalasseus bengalensis) is a tern in the family Laridae.

Etymology
The genus name is from Ancient Greek Thalasseus, "fisherman" from thalassa, "sea". The specific bengalensis means "of Bengal", the type locality, historically referring to much of northern India and Bangladesh.

Distribution

It breeds in subtropical coastal parts of the world mainly from the Red Sea across the Indian Ocean to the western Pacific, and Australia, with a significant population on the southern coast of the Mediterranean on two islands off the Libyan coast. Accidental breeding has also been reported in Italy and France. The Australian birds are probably sedentary, but other populations are migratory, wintering south to South Africa.

Subspecies
This bird has a number of geographical subspecies, differing mainly in size and minor plumage details:
 T. b. emigrata (Neumann, 1934): breeding in the Mediterranean on islands off the coast of Libya, wintering West Africa. Pale grey above (only marginally darker than Sandwich tern); slightly larger.
 T. b. bengalensis (Lesson, 1831): northern Indian Ocean, wintering to South Africa. Medium-dark grey above; slightly smaller.
 T. b. torresii (Gould, 1843): Indonesia south to Queensland, Australia, wintering in the same area (birds breeding in the Persian Gulf are also often given as this race). Dark grey above; slightly larger.

The Mediterranean race is a rare vagrant to Europe, and has bred in pure or mixed pairs (with Sandwich tern) in Italy, Spain and England.

This species breeds in dense colonies on coasts and islands. It nests in a ground scrape and lays one to two (rarely three) eggs. Nesting behaviour is very similar to that of Sandwich terns, with predator avoidance by nesting in very dense colonies, and also (in race emigrata at least) by nesting in the late summer when predatory yellow-legged gulls have finished breeding and departed from the nesting area.

Description
Like all Thalasseus terns, lesser crested tern feeds by plunge-diving for fish, usually from saline environments. It usually dives directly, and not from the "stepped-hover" favoured by Arctic tern.  The offering of fish by the male to the female is part of the courtship display.

This is a medium-large tern, very similar in size and general appearance to its three very close relatives Sandwich tern, Elegant tern and Chinese crested tern. The summer adult has a black cap, black legs and a long sharp orange bill. The upperwings, rump and central tail feathers are grey and the underparts white. The primary flight feathers darken during the summer. In winter, the forehead becomes white. The call is a loud grating noise like Sandwich tern.

The grey rump is a useful flight identification feature distinguishing it from the related species. The Elegant tern also differs in a slightly longer, slenderer bill, while Chinese crested tern differs in a black tip to the bill and Sandwich tern a black bill with a yellow tip.

Juvenile lesser crested terns resemble same-age Sandwich terns, but with a yellow-orange bill, and paler overall, with only faint dark crescents on the mantle feathers.

There are two other orange-billed terns within the range of this species, royal tern and Greater crested tern. Both are much larger and stouter-billed; royal also has a white rump and tail, while crested (which shares the grey rump) is darker overall above and has a yellower bill. See also orange-billed tern.

Conservation
T. bengalensis is one of the species to which the Agreement on the Conservation of African-Eurasian Migratory Waterbirds (AEWA) applies, and one of 10 marine bird species listed in Mediterranean marine birds Action Plan.

In India the Lesser crested tern is protected in the PM Sayeed Marine Birds Conservation Reserve.

References

Further reading 
 Azafzaf, H., Etayeb, K. & Hamza, A. 2006: Report on the census of Lesser Crested Tern Sterna bengalensis in the Eastern coast of Libya. (1–7 August 2006). Unpublished report to Regional Activities Centre/Special Protected Areas (MAP/UNEP), Environment General Agency (Libya) and African-Eurasian Waterbird Agreement (UNEP/AEWA). 18 pp with map and four Appendices.
 Baker N.E (1984). Lesser Crested Tern in Bengazi, Libya. Bull. Orn. Soc. Middle East.
 Hamza, A.,  H. Azafzaf, N. Baccetti, E.M. Bourass, J. J.Borg, P. Defos du Rau, A. Saied, J. Sultana, M. Zenatello (2008) Report on census and ringing of Lesser Crested Tern in Libya (2-10 Aug. 2007), with a preliminary inventory of Libyan islands. UNEP-MAP-RAC/SPA and EGA. Tech. Report.
 Meininger, Peter L., Pim A. Wolf, Dan A. Hadoud and Mohamed F. A. Essghaier (1994) Rediscovery of Lesser Crested Tern breeding in Libya British Birds 87(4):160-170.
 Moltoni E. (1938). Escursione ornitologica all’Isola degli Uccelli (Golfo della Gran Sirte, Cirenaica). Riv. Ital. Orn 8 : 1-16.

External links 
 Lesser crested tern - Species text in The Atlas of Southern African Birds

lesser crested tern
Birds of North Africa
Birds of Australia
Birds of Indonesia
Birds of the Maldives
Birds of the Arabian Peninsula
lesser crested tern
Taxa named by René Lesson
Articles containing video clips